Labops is a genus of plant bugs in the family Miridae. There are about 13 described species in Labops.

Species
These 13 species belong to the genus Labops:

 Labops bami Kulik, 1979
 Labops brooksi Slater, 1954
 Labops burmeisteri Stal, 1858
 Labops chelifer Slater, 1954
 Labops hesperius Uhler, 1872 (black grass bug)
 Labops hirtus Knight, 1922
 Labops kerzhneri Vinokurov, 2010
 Labops nivchorum Kerzhner, 1988
 Labops sahlbergii (Fallén, 1829)
 Labops setosus Reuter, 1891
 Labops tumidifrons Knight, 1922
 Labops utahensis Slater, 1954
 Labops verae Knight, 1929

References

Further reading

 
 
 

Miridae
Articles created by Qbugbot